Axoa (pronunciation: ashoa) is a typical Basque dish prepared with mashed veal, onions, tomatoes sauté and flavoured with red Espelette pepper.

This dish was served on the days of fairs. The recipe is not precisely defined.

See also
 List of stews

External links
 
  Recette d'Axoa

Basque cuisine
Spanish soups and stews
Veal dishes
Tomato dishes